Mountain Rose Academy is a tuition free public high school in Tucson, Arizona, United States. Mountain Rose Academy serves the communities of Northwest Tucson, Marana, and Oro Valley with an enrollment of 245 students.

References 

Charter schools in Arizona
Public high schools in Arizona
1998 establishments in Arizona
Schools in Tucson, Arizona
Schools in Pima County, Arizona
Educational institutions established in 1998